Los Dúo, Vol. 3 is the thirty-first and final studio album by Mexican musician Juan Gabriel, released on November 11, 2022. It features artists performing duets with Juan Gabriel, including Anahí, Gloria Trevi, Danna Paola, Mon Laferte, Pepe Aguilar and others.

Track listing
All songs written and composed by Juan Gabriel except for "Have You Ever Seen the Rain?" by John Fogerty.

References 

Juan Gabriel albums
2022 albums
Spanish-language albums
Fonovisa Records albums
Vocal duet albums
Sequel albums